Sabunchi is a town in the Ararat Province of Armenia.

References 

Populated places in Armenia
Yazidi populated places in Armenia